The 2018–19 LEN Euro Cup was the second tier of European competition in water polo. It ran from 28 September 2018 to 13 April 2019.

Overview

Team allocation

Phases and rounds dates
The schedule of the competition is as follows.

Qualifying rounds

Qualification round I

Group A

Group B

Group C

Group D

Qualification round II

Group E

Group F

Knockout stage

Bracket

Quarter-finals

|}

Semi-finals

|}

Final

|}

See also
2018–19 LEN Champions League

References

External links

LEN Euro Cup seasons
Euro Cup
2018 in water polo
2019 in water polo